Pregnancy-specific biological substances, which include the placenta, umbilical cord, amniotic fluid, and amniotic membrane are being studied for a number of health uses. For example, Placental-derived stem cells are being studied so they can serve as a potential treatment method for cell therapy. Hepatocyte-like cells (HLC) are generated from differentiated human amniotic epithelial cells (hAEC) that are abundant in the placenta. HLC may replace hepatocytes for hepatocyte transplantation to treat acute or chronic liver damage.

Recent research has shown that the placenta and placenta derivatives are being regenerative cell therapies and also includes immunological features. Placenta structures consist of unique physiognomies. Placenta's structure not only regulates its function but also gives the probability of efficient use in clinics and in biotechnology.

According to a research study by Bhattacharya N., Anemia caused by Diabetes mellitus in patients with albuminuria can be treated with cord blood transfusion. The research showed increased in albumin per gram of creatinine that assessed for albuminuria for patients that received cord blood transfusions.

References

Human pregnancy
Organs (anatomy)